The Automobile Barcelona is an auto show held every second year at Fira de Barcelona's Montjuïc Exhibition Centre in the city of Barcelona, Catalonia (Spain). Established in 1919, the Automobile Barcelona is one of the biggest trade fairs held at Barcelona’s Fira exhibition site and one of the most important fairs in Spain for both the number of visitors and participating brands. The show is scheduled in May (odd-numbered years) by the Organisation Internationale des Constructeurs d'Automobiles (OICA).

2013
The 2013 show opened on 11 May. The show had two international debuts and four European launches.

Renault Twizy F1
Volkswagen e-up

2011
The 2011 show ran from 14-22 May.

 Hyundai i40 Sedan
 Volkswagen Scirocco "Limited Edition"

2009
 Audi Q3 Concept
 Abarth 695 Tributo Ferrari
 Dacia Sandero Stepway 
 Fiat 500 TwinAir
 Ford Focus Latvala
 Nissan NV200 Van
 Mercedes-Benz Viano "Ice Age"
 Opel Insignia OPC 
 Seat Exeo ST
 Seat Ibiza "25th Anniversary"
 Seat Ibiza Bocanegra
 Seat Ibiza FR 
 Seat Leon Cupra (facelift)
 Skoda Fabia Sportline
 Skoda Roomster Orbea

2007
 Citroën C4 Pallas
 Ford Focus WRC-S Edition
 Kia Picanto
 Opel Corsa GSi 
 Peugeot 207 SW
 Seat Altea Freetrack
 Mazel SRX
 Sunred SR08 Prototype

2005
Dates: from the 7th until 15 May

 Nissan Navara King Cab
 Seat Leon
 Suzuki Swift Super 1600
 Fiat Sportiva Latina Concept

2003
 Renault Megane Classic
 Renault Megane Grandtour
 Renault Kangoo 4x4
 Lancia Granturismo Stilnovo Concept
 Jaguar XF10 Concept (Fuore)
 Seat Cupra GT Concept
 Seat León Cupra R

2001
 Nissan Primera
 Seat Leon Cupra R Concept

1999
 Seat Ibiza 3-door
 Seat Ibiza 5-door
 Suzuki Jimny Canvas Top

1997
 Renault Kangoo
 Seat Cordoba Vario

1993
 SEAT Concepto T Cabrio
 Seat Ibiza 3-door

1991
 Seat Toledo

1989
 Pegaso Solo 500 (concept)

1987
 Pegaso Troner

1975
 Porsche 930 Turbo (3.0-liter)
 SEAT 131

1974

 Alfa Romeo 2000 Spider Veloce Aerodinamica
 SEAT 133

1973
 SEAT 132

1970
 Seat 124 Sport

1967
 Lamborghini 400GT Monza
 Artes Campeador
 Hispakart GT

1955
 Pegaso Z-207 Prototype

References

External links
 

Auto shows in Spain
Barcelona
1919 establishments in Spain
Recurring events established in 1919